Terminal Station (released in the United States as Indiscretion of an American Wife) is a 1953 romantic drama film directed and produced by Vittorio De Sica and starring Jennifer Jones, Montgomery Clift, and Richard Beymer (credited as "Dick Beymer") in his debut role. It tells the story of the love affair between a married American woman and an Italian intellectual. The title refers to the Roma Termini railway station in Rome, where the film takes place. The film was entered into the 1953 Cannes Film Festival.

Terminal Station was the first Hollywood film of Italian director De Sica, as an international co-production with American mogul David O. Selznick. The collaboration was fraught with constant and severe creative differences between them that resulted in two different versions of the same film, an 89 minute Italian version and a 72 minute American recut under the alternate title Indiscretion of an American Wife. The experience was such that De Sica never worked with a Hollywood producer again, though he would make future English-language films with American actors.

Plot
While visiting her sister in Rome, Mary Forbes, an American housewife, has a month-long affair with Giovanni Doria, an Italian academic.

Cast

Production
The film is based on the story Stazione Termini by Cesare Zavattini. Truman Capote was credited with writing the entire screenplay, but later claimed to have written only two scenes. The film was an international co-production between De Sica's own company and the Hollywood producer David O. Selznick, who commissioned it as a vehicle for his wife, Jennifer Jones. The production of the film was troubled from the very beginning. Carson McCullers was originally chosen to write the screenplay, but Selznick fired her and replaced her with a series of writers, including Paul Gallico, Alberto Moravia and Capote. Disagreements ensued between De Sica and Selznick, and during production, Selznick would write 40- and 50-page letters to his director every day, although De Sica knew no English. After agreeing to everything, De Sica has said, he simply did things his way.

Montgomery Clift sided with De Sica in his disputes with Selznick, claiming that Selznick wanted the movie to look like a slick little love story, while De Sica wanted to depict a ruined romance. "Love relationships are ludicrous, painful, and gigantically disappointing. This couple loves each other but they become unconnected."

During filming, Jones was distracted and saddened by the recent death of her former husband, actor Robert Walker, and badly missed her two sons, who were at school in Switzerland. She had been married to Selznick less than two years at that point, and they were having difficulties in the marriage.

The original 1953 Italian release of the film ran 89 minutes, but it was later re-edited by Selznick down to 64 minutes. This was too short to qualify it as a feature film, so Selznick hired singer Patti Page, and filmed her singing two Italian-themed songs on a soundstage with James Wong Howe and attached this unrelated "overture" footage to the beginning of the film, before the credits, giving it a technical running time of 72 minutes. He also added additional close-ups and insert shots of Jones and Cliff, directed by Oswald Morris. Selznick released this version in the United States as Indiscretion of an American Wife (and as Indiscretion in the UK).

Reception 
Clift declared that he hated the picture and denounced it as "a big fat failure." Critics of the day agreed, giving it universally bad reviews. The Buffalo Evening News reviewer thought the production “beautifully photographed and technically tip top,” but was less happy with the plot and its unfolding: “Mr. Clift….shows distinct signs, unintentional of course, of wishing the train for Milan and Paris would pull out with Jennifer Jones and release him from the picture. There is much interest…in perusing the station populace….but a station is a poor field d’amour, as many a sailor knows….There is irony in the oogles they receive under arrest but the obvious lady’s obvious innocence allows no great tension as to the outcome. One is really more worried about the fate of Miss Jones’ fur coat, entrusted to a porter.” The two versions have been released together on DVD by The Criterion Collection. A 1998 remake of the film was made for television under the title Indiscretion of an American Wife.

Accolades
 Nomination for the Grand Prix of 1953 International Film Festival in Cannes (Vittorio De Sica).
 Nomination for the 1955 Academy Award for Best Costume Design in black and white (Christian Dior).

References

External links
 
 
 
 
 Indiscretion of an American Wife & Terminal Station an essay by David Kehr at the Criterion Collection

1953 films
1953 romantic drama films
American romantic drama films
American black-and-white films
Italian romantic drama films
Italian black-and-white films
English-language Italian films
1950s Italian-language films
Rail transport films
Films set in Rome
Films shot in Rome
Films directed by Vittorio De Sica
Films with screenplays by Truman Capote
Films based on works by Cesare Zavattini
Selznick International Pictures films
Columbia Pictures films
Films scored by Alessandro Cicognini
1950s American films
1950s Italian films